The Federal Capital Pioneer, also published as The Federal Capital Pioneer Magazine, was a newspaper published in Canberra, Australia from 1924 to 1927.

History
The Federal Capital Pioneer was published from 3 December 1924 to August 1926 in Canberra. It was then published as The Federal Capital Pioneer Magazine from 15 October 1926 to 20 August 1927.

Digitisation

This newspaper has been digitised as part of the Australian Newspapers Digitisation Program of the National Library of Australia.

See also
Canberra Community News
List of newspapers in Australia

References

External links
 
 

Defunct newspapers published in the Australian Capital Territory
Newspapers established in 1924
Publications disestablished in 1927